Nancy Barnes (born 1961) is an American journalist and newspaper editor. She is currently the editor of The Boston Globe. She is also a member of the Peabody Awards board of directors, which is presented by the Henry W. Grady College of Journalism and Mass Communication.

Education

Barnes earned a bachelor's degree in international relations from the University of Virginia and an MBA from the University of North Carolina.

Career 
Before joining The Boston Globe in 2023, Barnes was the chief news executive at NPR.  Prior jobs include editor of the Minneapolis Star Tribune from 2003 to 2013 and editor and executive vice president of news for the  Houston Chronicle between 2013 and 2018.

In 2013, while Barnes was editor at the Star Tribune the paper won the Pulitzer Prize for local news for reporting on infant deaths at day care facilities. It also won the Gerald Loeb Award for Breaking News and two 2013 Edward R. Murrow Awards for multimedia journalism.

While she led the Chronicle the paper won the 2015 Pulitzer Prize for commentary. It was a Pulitzer finalist in 2017 for reports on the denial of special education to tens of thousands of Texas students, and a 2018 finalist for its reporting on Hurricane Harvey.

At NPR, Barnes succeeded Michael Oreskes after he was fired over sexual harassment allegations. Barnes is the fourteenth person and fourth woman to head NPR's news division since the position was defined in 1979.

On November 14, 2022, The Boston Globe announced that Barnes would become its 13th editor and the first woman to lead the Globe's newsroom.

References

American women journalists
NPR
1960s births
Living people
University of Virginia alumni
University of North Carolina alumni
American newspaper editors
21st-century American women